Chonbuk Buffalo was a South Korean professional football club, based in Jeonbuk. Lasting only one year in the K League, the club was the root of the Jeonbuk Hyundai Motors. However, K League and Jeonbuk Hyundai Motors officially considers Chonbuk Buffalo as a different club.

History 
Predecessor of Chonbuk Buffalo was established in January 1993 as Wansan Puma FC. Wansan Puma was scheduled to join the 1993 season of K League, but was postponed for one year due to draft boycott.

In 1994, Wansan Puma changed its name to Chonbuk Buffalo. Their one and only season in 1994 saw them gather only 14 points from their 30 matches, winning just three times and finishing last, before the club folded.

References

 
K League clubs
K
Association football clubs established in 1993
Association football clubs disestablished in 1994
Sport in North Jeolla Province
1993 establishments in South Korea
1994 disestablishments in South Korea